The 2016 West Coast Conference men's soccer season is the 29th season of men's varsity soccer in the conference.

The defending champions are the Santa Clara Broncos who won the regular season last year (the conference does not host a tournament).

Changes from 2015 

 None

Teams

Stadiums and locations

Regular season

Rankings

NSCAA national

NSCAA Far West regional

Results

Postseason

NCAA tournament

All-WCC awards and teams

See also 
 2016 NCAA Division I men's soccer season
 2016 West Coast Conference women's soccer season

References 

2016 NCAA Division I men's soccer season
West Coast Conference men's soccer seasons